System Shock is a 1994 first-person action role-playing video game developed by Looking Glass Technologies.

System Shock may also refer to:

System Shock (novel), 1995 novel written by Justin Richards
System Shock (2023 video game), upcoming remake of the 1994 video game
System Shock (band), Swedish/Greek heavy metal band

See also
Shock System, Malaysian rock band
Shock to the System (disambiguation)